Gazik Rural District is in Gazik District of Darmian County, South Khorasan province, Iran. At the National Census of 2006, its population was 6,742 in 1,648 households. There were 4,151 inhabitants in 1,034 households at the following census of 2011. At the most recent census of 2016, the population of the rural district was 4,201 in 1,039 households. The largest of its 16 villages was Avaz, with 1,696 people.

References 

Darmian County

Rural Districts of South Khorasan Province

Populated places in South Khorasan Province

Populated places in Darmian County